Kahang is a state constituency in Johor, Malaysia, that is represented in the Johor State Legislative Assembly.

History

Polling districts 
According to the gazette issued on 33 March 2018, the Kahang constituency has a total of 10 polling districts.

Representation history

Election results

References 

Johor state constituencies